Carlos Alberto Contreras Caño (born 11 December 1973) is a Colombian former professional road cyclist.

Major results

1991
 1st  Overall 
1994
 3rd Overall Vuelta de la Juventud de Colombia
1995
 10th Classique des Alpes
1996
 6th Overall Vuelta a Colombia
1st Stage 14
1997
 2nd Time trial, National Road Championships
 5th Overall Vuelta a Colombia
1999
 1st  Overall Vuelta a Colombia
1st Stage 9
2001
 8th Overall Giro d'Italia
1st Stage 14
2002
 3rd Overall Vuelta a Antioquia
2003
 1st  Overall Vuelta a Antioquia
1st Stage 1

Grand Tour general classification results timeline

References

External links
 

1973 births
Living people
People from Manizales
Colombian male cyclists
Vuelta a Colombia stage winners
Colombian Giro d'Italia stage winners